Defending champion Steffi Graf defeated Monica Seles in a rematch of the previous year's final, 7–5, 6–4 to win the women's singles tennis title at the 1996 US Open. Graf did not lose a set during the tournament.

This was the final major appearance for 1990 champion Gabriela Sabatini. It was also the final major singles appearance for 15-time major quarterfinalist and former world No. 4 Zina Garrison.

Seeds
The seeded players are listed below. Steffi Graf is the champion; others show the round in which they were eliminated.

Chanda Rubin pulled out before the tournament began and her position in the draw was taken over by seventeenth-seeded Karina Habšudová, Rubin was replaced by lucky loser Annabel Ellwood; Mary Joe Fernández, who withdrew on the first day of the tournament, was replaced by lucky loser Tina Križan.

Qualifying

Draw

Finals

Top half

Section 1

Section 2

Section 3

Section 4

Bottom half

Section 5

Section 6

Section 7

Section 8

External links
1996 US Open – Women's draws and results at the International Tennis Federation

See also
1996 US Open – Men's singles

Women's Singles
US Open (tennis) by year – Women's singles
1996 in women's tennis
1996 in American women's sports